Tugela Tuyeni (born 5 February 1982 Onekwaya in the Ohangwena Region – died 16 December 2016 Tsumeb, Oshikoto Region) was a Namibian midfield footballer with F.C. Civics Windhoek of the Namibia Premier League and the Namibia national football team.

Tugela fled into exile for the liberation of Namibia as a little boy tailing his parents to various refugee camps in Angola and Zambia respectively during Namibia’s liberation war against the South African apartheid regime. He then became a resident of Swakopmund where he was placed in the care of his aunt to start his primary education until he completed his secondary education at Namibia’s most revered holiday resort.

References

1982 births
2016 deaths
Namibian men's footballers
Namibia international footballers
People from Ohangwena Region
Blue Waters F.C. players
Association football midfielders
F.C. Civics Windhoek players